The Jackson 5 are an American music group, formed in 1964 by the Jackson family brothers Jackie, Tito, Jermaine, Marlon, and Michael. The brothers first invitation to perform was in Glen Park in 1965, with other early concerts at Theodore Roosevelt College and Career Academy, Gilroy Stadium, Gary’s Memorial Auditorium, Regal Theater, Chicago and Apollo Theater, Harlem in 1967.

The quintet's first concert tour was in the United States, where they performed in cities such as Boston, Cincinnati and New York City throughout the final quarter of 1970. The brothers remained in their homeland for two more US tours, before successfully expanding to Europe in 1971 and the rest of world the following year.

Following a move from Motown to Epic Records, the group was renamed the Jacksons, and embarked on another tour of Europe, where they performed in front of Queen Elizabeth II. After their interim concert series in 1978, the siblings proceeded with the Destiny Tour, a promotional platform for their similarly named album. Their 1981 36-city circulation of the United States—the Triumph Tour—came next. The Jacksons' final tour together was in 1984, following the release of two albums: the band's Victory and Michael Jackson's Thriller. The Victory Tour spanned 55 performances in the United States and Canada and grossed over $75 million.

Having toured with his brothers since the early 1970s, Michael Jackson began his first solo world tour on September 12, 1987, in Tokyo, Japan. Attracting over 4 million people, including royalty, the Bad Tour  proved to be successful, becoming the most-highly attended and highest-earning tour of all time. The follow-up concert series—the Dangerous World Tour of 1992–1993—was also attended by millions. In 1996, Jackson returned with the HIStory World Tour, an 82 run of concerts that concluded the following year. The tour was attended by more than 4.5 million fans.

Tours

The Jackson 5

The Jacksons

Michael Jackson

The Jacksons

Countries covered

The HIStory World Tour covered 35 countries, with the Unity Tour covering 19 countries. Between all the group and solo tours, the brothers have played concerts in more than 50 countries on 6 continents (ie everywhere except Antarctica).
Some of the countries include United States, United Kingdom, Canada, Brazil, Australia, India, and Russia.

Band members

References
Footnotes

Bibliography

George, Nelson (2004). Michael Jackson: The Ultimate Collection booklet. Sony BMG.

 
 
Jackson, Michael